Rasmus Hedegaard (born Rasmus Hedegård Sørensen, 25 July 1988), using the mononym Hedegaard (sometimes stylized as HEDEGAARD), is a Danish DJ and music producer. He is signed to Copenhagen Records. His management is TWTTW (Then We Take The World) with Lasse Siegismund and Kasper Færk. Many know him for his remix of "Dr. Dre – Next Episode" and his Scandinavian chart topping single "Happy Home" featuring the band Lukas Graham which went 3 times platinum in Denmark and Norway and platinum in Sweden.

Career 
Hedegaard was born in Randers, and started his career remixing tracks for Danish nightclubs and uploading them to YouTube. Including his unofficial remix of Snoop Dogg and Dr. Dres hit "The Next Episode", which made Hedegaard well known across Europe. The song has been played more than 100 million times on YouTube. He has also remixed 50 Cent, Macklemore, Basto, Ludacris, Stromae, Ed Sheeran, Snoop Dogg, Eminem and Rihanna.

In 2012, Hedegaard started producing original tracks, and with the release of “Happy Home” in 2014, his career escalated from performing in nightclubs, to larger events and festivals like Distortion, Skanderborg Festival, Nibe Festival, Skive Festival, VG-Lista (NO), Peace & Love Festival (SE) and ABC Beach Party. Furthermore, he started booking outside of Denmark in numerous Scandinavian and European countries.

In 2014, Hedegaard released "Happy Home", featuring Lukas Graham Forchhammer. The song was played heavily on the Danish radio station P3 and was put in A rotation on several other radio stations. On streaming and sale it was #1 for several weeks in Danmark and has now accumulated more than 38 million streams in total (July 2017). After performing on the Norwegian talk show "Senkveld med Thomas og Harald",[9] the song became #1 on the Norwegian iTunes and was certified 3× platinum on streaming in Norway.[10] In 2014 Hedegaard won an award as "Producer of the Year" for the hit "Happy Home" at Danish Music Awards 2014. In 2015 he won another award for "Most Played Song Of The Year" at "Carl Prisen".
 
Later in 2014, Hedegaard released “Twerk It Like Miley” featuring Brandon Beal and Christopher. The song has more than 56 million streams on Spotify and 158 million views on YouTube and it reached #1 in a couple of Asian countries. "Twerk It Like Miley" won 3 awards at Danish DeeJay Awards 2015 and is now 3× platinum in Denmark, platinum in Philippines, and gold in Indonesia, Taiwan and Thailand.

In 2016, Hedegaard won the award as ”Producer of the Year” at Club Awards as well as the ”Audience Award” at Danish DeeJay Awards. Subsequently, he won the prize for best Danish remix of the year at Danish DeeJay Awards 2017 for the remix of ”Slem Igen”.

In 2017, the single ”That’s Me” was released and has since gained 20 million streams on Spotify. The Australian singer and songwriter Hayley Warner sings the song and in the spring of 2017 they met up in LA and wrote the single “Go Back”.

Hedegaard is signed to the Danish record label Copenhagen Records. His management is TWTTW (Then We Take the World) and they have offices in Copenhagen and Los Angeles. Other than Hedegaard, artists also signed to the label include Lukas Graham, Brandon Beal, Patrick Dorgan, Hennedub, Feels, JRM, OK OK, and Ylva.

Discography

Singles 

Notes

Discography as Producer

Remixes 
 50 Cent - P.I.M.P. (Hedegaard Remix) 
 Jimilian feat. Ceci Luca - Slem Igen (Hedegaard Remix)	 
 50 Cent - Disco Inferno (Hedegaard Remix)	
 Brandon Beal ft. Christopher - Twerk It Like Miley (Hedegaard Remix)	 
 Christopher ft. Brandon Beal - CPH Girls (Hedegaard Remix)	 
 Kesi - Søvnløs (Hedegaard Remix)	 
 Hedegaard ft. Lukas Graham - Happy Home (Club Edit)	 
 Eminem ft. Rihanna - The Monster (Hedegaard Remix)	
 Eminem ft. Nate Dogg - Shake That (Hedegaard & Matt Hawk Remix)	
 Macklemore - Thrift Shop (Hedegaard Remix)	
 Ludacris - Move Bitch (Hedegaard Remix)	
 Lukas Graham - Ordinary Things (Hedegaard Remix)	 
 Dr. Dre - The Next Episode ft. Snoop Dogg, Kurupt, Nate Dogg (Hedegaard Remix)	
 50 Cent - In Da Club (Hedegaard Remix)

Awards and nominations

References

External links

Rasmus Hedegaards hjemmeside

Living people
Lukas Graham
Danish DJs
Danish record producers
1988 births
Electronic dance music DJs
People from Randers